Jaret von Rosenberg (born April 12, 1987) is an American college basketball coach and former player. He is currently the head coach of the Texas A&M–Commerce Lions men's basketball team.

Playing career
von Rosenberg played high school basketball at Sharyland High School in Mission, Texas before playing at Collin County Community College. von Rosenberg would transfer and play college basketball at Hartford where he was the school's all-time leader in career free throw percentage (.831) and ranked in the top 10 in career assists and steals upon graduation.

Coaching career
von Rosenberg began his coaching career in 2009 as an assistant at Collin County Community College. In 2011, von Rosenberg was hired as an assistant coach under Joe Golding at Abilene Christian. He was hired under Sam Walker at Texas A&M–Commerce in 2013 before returning to his alma mater Hartford in 2015 as an assistant. 

In 2017, von Rosenberg was hired as head coach at Texas A&M–Commerce, replacing Sam Walker.

Head coaching record

References

External links
Texas A&M–Commerce Lions bio

1987 births
Living people
Abilene Christian Wildcats men's basketball coaches
American men's basketball players
Basketball coaches from Texas
Basketball players from Texas
Guards (basketball)
Hartford Hawks men's basketball coaches
Hartford Hawks men's basketball players
Junior college men's basketball coaches in the United States
Junior college men's basketball players in the United States
People from Mission, Texas
Texas A&M–Commerce Lions men's basketball coaches